The black-faced antthrush (Formicarius analis), is a species of passerine bird in the family Formicariidae.

Taxonomy
The black-faced antthrush was formally described in 1837 by the French naturalists Alcide d'Orbigny and Frédéric de Lafresnaye from a specimen collected in Bolivia. They coined the binomial name Myothera analis. The specific epithet is from the Modern Latin analis meaning "relating to the undertail-coverts of the vent". The black-faced antthrush  is now placed in the genus Formicarius that was introduced by the Dutch naturalist Pieter Boddaert in 1783.

Eleven subspecies are recognised:
 F. a. umbrosus Ridgway, 1893 – east Honduras to west Panama
 F. a. hoffmanni (Cabanis, 1861) – southwest Costa Rica and southwest Panama
 F. a. panamensis Ridgway, 1908 – east Panama and northwest Colombia
 F. a. virescens Todd, 1915 – Sierra Nevada de Santa Marta (northeast Colombia)
 F. a. saturatus Ridgway, 1893 – north Colombia, northwest Venezuela and Trinidad
 F. a. griseoventris Aveledo & Ginés, 1950 – Perijá Mountains (northeast Colombia and northwest Venezuela)
 F. a. connectens Chapman, 1914 – east Colombia
 F. a. zamorae Chapman, 1923 – east Ecuador, northeast Peru and west Brazil
 F. a. crissalis (Cabanis, 1861) – east Venezuela, the Guianas and northeast Brazil
 F. a. analis (d'Orbigny & Lafresnaye, 1837) – east, southeast Peru, north Bolivia and central Brazil
 F. a. paraensis Novaes, 1957 – southeast Amazonian Brazil

The subspecies hoffmanni is sometimes recognised as a distinct species, the Panama antthrush, based primarily of its different song. The Mayan antthrush (Formicarius moniliger) was formerly considered conspecific with the black-faced antthrush.

Description
The black-faced antthrush is similar in general appearance to a rail, with a dumpy body, horizontal carriage, stout bill and short cocked tail. It walks rather than hops, with a jerky motion again reminiscent of a rail. The upper parts are rufous brown, and the underparts are paler brown, except for the black face and throat, and rufous under the tail and behind the eye. The sexes are alike in plumage.

Distribution and habitat

It is a common and widespread forest bird in the tropical New World, from Honduras through Central America to the northern regions of South America.  It occurs in Colombia, Venezuela, Trinidad and Brazil, and the Amazon Basin with the exception of the northwest region.

Behaviour
The antthrush builds a leaf-lined nest in a cavity in a hollow branch or stump in which two white eggs are laid.  It is an insectivore which feeds on ants and other insects.  It is quite terrestrial, feeding mainly on the ground. It will follow columns of army ants.  The call is a loud whistle followed by a series of 2–10 descending whistles, WHU! wu-wu-wu-wu-wu-wu-wu-wu-wu.

References

Further reading

 Skutch describes the race Formicarius analis hoffmanni.

External links
Black-faced antthrush videos on the Internet Bird Collection
Black-faced antthrush photo gallery VIREO

black-faced antthrush
Birds of Central America
Birds of the Amazon Basin
Birds of the Guianas
Birds of Colombia
Birds of Venezuela
Birds of Trinidad and Tobago
black-faced antthrush
Birds of Brazil
Taxa named by Frédéric de Lafresnaye
Taxa named by Alcide d'Orbigny